Patriarch Photios of Constantinople may refer to:

 Photios I of Constantinople, Ecumenical Patriarch in 858–867 and 877–886
 Photios II of Constantinople, Ecumenical Patriarch in 1929–1935